William Hoover may refer to:

 Buster Hoover (William James Hoover), American outfielder in Major League Baseball
 William G. Hoover, American computational physicist
 William Henry Hoover, founder of the Hoover Company